Learning Disability Practice is a monthly nursing journal which publishes original research and clinical articles relevant to the practice of learning disability nursing. It is published by RCNi.

External links
 

Monthly journals
Psychiatric and mental health nursing journals
Royal College of Nursing publications
English-language journals
Publications established in 1998